Chitarra Italiana ('Italian guitar') is a lute-shaped plucked instrument with four or five single (sometimes double) strings, in a tuning similar to that of the guitar. It was common in Italy during the Renaissance era.

According to Renato Meucci, the designation of 'Italiana' followed the introduction to Italy of the flat-backed development of the instrument – referred to as chitarra alla spagnola  (literally 'Spanish guitar'); to distinguish between the two versions. It is believed to have descended from panduras, the Mediterranean lutes of Antiquity, and to be related to North African quitra (or kwitra).

Its bass variety was known as chitarrone. Musicologist Laurence Wright talked about the chitarrone in a letter to the Early Music journal (October 1976), saying it implied "large guitar", that it had a rounded back and was likely to be taken for a smaller lute, and that it was found from the 13th century to the 18th century, but was much rarer in the later centuries. He also said that in latter years, when the mandola was popular, the chitarrone was "sometimes confused with the mandola".

See also

 Chitarra battente   (Guitar used on southern Italian folk music, also known as Chitarra Italiana)
 Mandore
 Gittern considered ancestral to Spanish guitar and possibly closely related to mandore. 
 Kwitra: Also spelled 'kouitra', 'kaitara', and 'quitra'. This is a North African 4 course lute, similar to the oud, and possibly related to the chitarra Italiana. (See articles Andalusian classical music - subsection 'Influence of Andalusian music' and Gittern - subsection 'Etymology')

References 

 
 The theorboed guitar - the Chitarrone Francese ?,  "Roberto Meucci recently wrote about small lutes, revealing that in Italy they were called chitarra, so as not to confuse them with the chitarra alla spagnola. Sources from the early 18th Century also declare that the chitarra italiana or chitarrino is in reality a small lute."

Composite chordophones
Necked bowl lutes
Early musical instruments